Eom Yeong-seop (born 10 July 1964) is a South Korean former cyclist. He competed in two events at the 1988 Summer Olympics.

References

External links
 

1964 births
Living people
South Korean male cyclists
Olympic cyclists of South Korea
Cyclists at the 1988 Summer Olympics
Place of birth missing (living people)
Asian Games medalists in cycling
Asian Games silver medalists for South Korea
Asian Games bronze medalists for South Korea
Cyclists at the 1986 Asian Games
Cyclists at the 1990 Asian Games
Medalists at the 1986 Asian Games
Medalists at the 1990 Asian Games
20th-century South Korean people
21st-century South Korean people